The Philippine Competition Commission (PhCC) is an independent, quasi-judicial body formed to implement the Philippine Competition Act (Republic Act No. 10667). The PhCC aims to promote and maintain market competition within the Philippines by regulating anti-competition behavior. The main role of the PhCC is to promote economic efficiency within the Philippine economy, ensuring fair and healthy market competition.

The Philippine Competition Commission institutes a regulatory environment for market competition in order to protect consumers, whereby they are aimed to be given access to more options over what goods or services to patronize. It would also have the effect of creating competitive businesses that would encourage economic efficiency and innovation.

The Philippine Competition Commission was formed on January 27, 2016. Since that time, the Philippine Competition Commission has formed offices through their mandate.



History 
The Philippine Competition Act (PCA) or Republic Act No. 10667 is the primary competition law of the Philippines. It aims to promote and protect market competition in the country. It protects the well-being of consumers and preserves the efficiency of competition in the marketplace.

The Philippine Competition Act was passed in 2015 after being stuck in Congress for 24 years. The Act is expected to improve consumer protection and help accelerate investment and job creation in the country, consistent with the goal of the national government in fostering an inclusive form of economic growth.

Enforcement of this law would help ensure that markets are open and free, challenging anti-competitive business practices, while maintaining an economic environment where businesses could compete based on the quality of their work.

A competitive market means a market with multiple buyers and multiple sellers, which has the effect of driving market prices lower and offering consumers more choices. For some economists, a "truly competitive market" encourages efficiency and innovation, forcing businesses to excel.

In 2014, a drastic increase in the price of garlic led to then President Benigno S. Aquino III conducting an investigation, which resulted in the discovery of a cartel controlling garlic imports. This led to Senator Paolo Benigno "Bam" Aquino IV authoring the 2014 Philippine Competition Act. This became the first instance wherein the Philippines gained a law specifically on competition.

Importance of Competition 
The official website of the Philippine Competition Commission cites the following reasons on why they consider market competition to be important:
 Competition leads to both economic growth and reduced poverty. It helps markets work better, fosters innovation, and protects investors and consumers. It will help to encourage wider domestic and foreign direct investments.
 Competition provides an improved enabling environment for small and medium enterprises that are critical to more inclusive economic growth and development in the country.
 Consumers win because free and fair competition leads to more choices, lower prices, and higher quality of goods.
In addition, the official website states that in its capacity as a regulatory body, the Philippine Competition Commission helps protect markets in the Philippines from anti-competitive behavior, thereby protecting consumers from having their choices unfairly limited by companies that seek to severely limit these choices in order to increase profits. Effective protection of competition in the market will also protect small and medium businesses seeking to offer better quality and/or lower priced goods and services by ensuring that dominant players do not engage in practices that unfairly takes advantage of their market share.

The official website of the Philippine Competition Commission states that a stable, fair playing field is expected to result in greater interest among foreign investors, which in turn would lead to an expansion of the market, and opening global opportunities for companies in the Philippines, big or small.

According to Howard Ellis, an anti-trust lawyer based in the United States, economics is inherently individualistic, and without the individual's ability to choose freely economics cannot exist. He says that by principle, a monopoly limits the free choice of an individual in the market by controlling both the price and the scarcity of a product. He says that this inability to choose creates an economic environment that is unsuitable for practicing the economic optimum, which describes the best application of limited resources to unlimited wants of consumers. A factor in economic stagnation is brought about by this lack of the pursuit of the optimum.

Organizational structure 
The Philippine Competition Commission is composed of six (6) offices, with respective divisions under them. According to the Philippine Competition Commission website, each office has the following functions:

Administrative (AO) 

The Administrative Office (AO) is composed of three divisions, namely, the General Services Division, Human Resources Development Division, and the Information and Communications Technology Division. Its main function is to act as the commission's deliverer of key corporate services in the areas of human resource management, procurement, information technology, and administration.

Communication & Knowledge Management Office (CKMO) 

The Communication & Knowledge Management (CKMO) consists of the Knowledge Management Division and the Training Division. It leads the commission's advocacy efforts to foster a culture of competition in the country, providing sustained support to improve the institutional and technical capacity of other PCC units. Its tasks are to identify areas of concern for the PCC, formulate strategies, execute programs, and create mechanisms to engage both its internal and external stakeholders. It also collaborates with relevant business groups, consumer associations, and statutory bodies to enhance awareness and understanding of the Philippine Competition Act.

Competition Enforcement Office (CEO) 

The Competition Enforcement Office (CEO) is divided into the Monitoring and Investigation Division, and the Litigation Division. It is in charge of monitoring, prevention, detection, investigation, and prosecution of anti-competitive agreements or abuse of dominant position conduct that substantially restricts, prevents, or lessens competition, as generally provided under Sections 14 and 15 of the Philippine Competition Act. To effectively enforce procedural fairness, it utilizes technical experts, highly trained investigators, and experienced litigators, while tapping synergies within the PCC, such as the Economics Office and the Mergers and Acquisitions Office. It likewise espouses Leniency and Whistleblower Programs as avenues for businesses and market stakeholders to self-police its ranks and report anti-competitive conduct.

Economics Office (EO) 

The Economics Office (EO) is organized between the Policy and Markets Division, and the Economic Investigation Division. Its task is to evaluate the impact of government policy on market competition and consumer welfare, and to provide economic analysis to support the detection and investigation of anti-competitive behavior. It handles cases led by the Mergers and Acquisitions Office or the Competition Enforcement Office, and supports the advocacy and knowledge management activities of the commission.

Finance, Planning, and Management Office (FPMO) 

The Finance, Planning, and Management (FPMO) has three (3) divisions under it, namely: the Budget Division, the Accounting Division, and the Corporate Planning & Management Division. Its work centers on providing the commission with effective and efficient advice and technical assistance on areas of budget and finance, plans and programs, management matters, and other functions, as may be provided by law.

Mergers and Acquisitions Office (MAO) 

The Mergers and Acquisitions Office reviews, investigates and evaluates mergers and acquisitions which are likely to substantially prevent, restrict, or lessen competition in the relevant market or in the market for goods or services. It receives notifications of proposed mergers and acquisitions that reach the threshold under the Implementing Rules and Regulations of the Philippine Competition Act, as well as cases referred to it by the commission for a motu proprio review. The Office works together with the Economic Office to investigate whether mergers and acquisitions are likely to result in a substantial lessening of competition in the market. Should it find that a merger or acquisition is likely to reduce competition and harm consumers through higher prices, lower quality of goods or services, or stifle innovation, it will submit a recommendation to the commission for the prohibition of the proposed transaction. It likewise develops guides for businesses on complying with antitrust laws through publication of Merger Guidelines, additional guidelines and clarificatory notes.

Commission members 
The Philippine Competition Commission, being an attached agency to the Office of the President, is headed by a chairperson and four (4) Commissioners. The Chairperson and the Commissioners make up the decision-making panel of the commission, and they work together in deciding on the different market competition issues that are under the jurisdiction of the PCC. In accordance with the Philippine Competition Act (PCA), they shall be appointed by the President, and have the rank equivalent of cabinet secretary and undersecretary, respectively. The primary requirement for their appointment would be being distinguished professionally in public, civic or academic service in the fields of economics, law, finance, commerce or engineering.

According to the PCA, the chairperson and the Commissioners are to serve for 7 years without reappointment, and shall enjoy security of tenure. Of the first set of appointees, the chairperson and two (2) Commissioners shall hold officer for a term of seven (7) years, and the other two (2) Commissioners shall serve a term of five (5) years.

Appointed by former President Benigno Aquino III, Arsenio Balisacan served as the first chairperson of the Philippine Competition Commission. After having left his position as the Economic Planning Secretary and Director-General of the National Economic and Development Authority (NEDA), he took his oath of office on January 27, 2016. Appointed PCC Commissioners Stella Quimbo, Johannes Bernabe, Elcid Butuyan and Menardo Guevarra also took part in the said oathtaking ceremony. In accordance with the PCA, Balisacan, as chair, would have served a seven-year term without reappointment. Quimbo and Bernabe will have a term of seven (7) years, while Butuyan and Guevarra will have a term of five (5) years.

Among the pioneer chairman and commissioners, Guevarra, Butuyan, Quimbo and Balisacan did not finish their set term. Guevarra vacated his position after being appointed as Senior Deputy Executive Secretary under the Office of the President on June 30, 2016, and was replaced by Amabelle Asuncion. Butuyan left the commission in July 2017 and was replaced by Macario De Claro, Jr. Quimbo vacated her seat after she got elected to the House of Representatives in the 2019 general election and was replaced by Emerson Aquende. On June 30, 2022, Balisacan was appointed by President Bongbong Marcos to be the head of the National Economic and Development Authority thus vacating his position as chairman of the commission. As the only remaining pioneer and most senior commissioner, Bernabe thus became the officer-in-charge of the commission from June 30, 2022, to the present.

Office members 
The PCC is also composed of an executive director and six directors, all of whom respectively head the offices of the commission. According to the PCA, it is the commission, namely the chairperson and the Commissioners, who shall appoint, and determine their status, qualifications, and duties. They, along with the other staff members of the commission, are required to possess at least a bachelor's degree in economics, law, finance, commerce, engineering, accounting, or management.

Current officials

List of chairpersons

Provisions of the Philippine Competition Act  
The Philippine Competition Commission issued the key provisions of the Republic Act No. 10667, otherwise known as the Philippine Competition Act, on June 3, 2016. The provisions took effect on June 18, 2016.

The Philippine Competition Act provides for the regulation of the country's markets to curtail anti-competitive behavior and punish cartels and other unfair monopolies.

Under Sec. 3 of RA 10667, the Commission shall impose this Act against any person or entity engaged in any trade, industry and commerce in the Republic of the Philippines. Moreover, it shall also be applied to international trade with direct, substantial, and reasonably foreseeable effects in trade, industry and commerce.

Under Sec. 6 of RA 10667, the Act provides the rules in creating the Philippine Competition Commission.
 The commission will be composed of 1 cabinet secretary-level Chairman, and 4 Commissioners. They will serve for 7 years, without reappointment and shall enjoy security of term.
 During the term of the Commissioners, they shall not hold any other office and employment, directly or indirectly practice any profession (except participating in government-owned corporations) and engage in a conflict of interest of their office.
 The Compensation and Salaries for Members and Personnel of the Commission shall be exempted from the Republic Act No. 6758 (Salary Standardization Act) and will be based on objective classification system focusing on the importance and responsibilities of their positions.
Under Sec. 12 of RA 10667, the Commission prohibits Anti-Competitive Agreements and Acts. The law indicated the following violations:
 Restricting competition as to price, or components thereof, or other terms of trade.
 Fixing price at an auction or in any form of bidding including cover bidding, bid suppression, bid rotation and market allocation and other analogous practices of bid manipulation.
Other anti-competitive agreements whose "object or effect of substantially preventing, restricting or lessening competition" are also prohibited but subject to "rule of reason".

These include:
 Setting, limiting, or controlling production, markets, technical development, or investment.
 Dividing or sharing the market, whether by volume of sales or purchases, territory, type of goods or services, buyers or sellers or any other means.

Abuse of Dominant Position 

Under Sec. 15 of RA 10667, the entities (whether companies or individuals) are prohibited from abusing their dominant position by engaging in conduct that would substantially prevent, restrict or lessen competition. Such conduct includes predatory pricing, imposing barriers to entry in an anti-competitive manner, unfair exercise of monopsony power, among others

Mergers and acquisitions 

Under Sec. 17 of RA 10667, merger or acquisition agreements that substantially prevent, restrict or lessen competition are prohibited.
 Parties to the merger or acquisition agreement where the value of the transaction exceeds Two Billion Two Million Pesos (Php 2,200,000,000.00) and the size of the person/party exceeds Five Billion Six Hundred Million Pesos (Php 5, 600, 000, 000.00) are required to notify the Commission of such agreement, and they cannot consummate the same without the approval of the commission until thirty (30) days. The Commission may also prescribe other criteria (e.g., increased market share in the relevant market in excess of minimum thresholds) that would trigger this notification requirement.
 When the agreement is violated, the parties shall be subject to an administrative fine of one-percent (1%) to five percent (5%) off the value of the transaction.
 The Commission may request for further information that are reasonably necessary which would extend the period within which the agreement may not be consummated for another sixty (60) days. The merger or acquisition shall be considered approved and parties may proceed to consummate it when the period has already expired without decision.
 If the Commission declared that the agreement is prohibited, it may prohibit the implementation of the agreement unless there are changes indicated or the parties enter into legally enforceable agreements stated by the commission.
 The Merger or acquisition agreement that are prohibited may be exempt from prohibition by the Commission provided that the parties establish that the concentration has brought or expected to bring gains in efficiency that are greater that the effects of any limitation on competition or faced with actual or imminent financial failure.

Fines and Penalties 

The law imposes fines and penalties on violators of the law. Under Sec. 29 of RA 10667, administrative fines of up to Php 250 million pesos can be imposed. In addition, the party which fails to comply with the commission's order shall pay a penalty of not less than Php 50,000.00 up to Php 2,000,000.00 for each violation. For those parties that provide incorrect or misleading information, it may impose fines of at most Php 1,000,000.00.

Under Sec. 30 of RA 10667, criminal penalties for anti-competitive agreements are punishable by imprisonment of 2 to 7 years and a fine of Php 50 million pesos to Php 250 million pesos. To maintain the real value of such fines, the amount is subject to adjustment every five years.

Preliminary Inquiry 

Under Sec. 31 of RA 10667, the Commission shall have the sole and exclusive authority to conduct a preliminary inquiry after a verified party filed a complaint on the basis of probable cause. The Commission may issue an order for the temporary termination of those certain acts by the respondent party after due notice and hearing and once the basis of facts and evidence are presented. If the evidence is validated, the Commission may file criminal complaints against the Act on the Department of Justice which will do preliminary investigation.

Relationship with Existing Sector Regulators 

Under Sec. 32 of RA 10667, the commission will have original and primary jurisdiction over all competition-related issues. It shall also have jurisdiction over all other issues that involve both competition and non-competition issues, but the concerned sector regulator must be consulted and afforded reasonable opportunity to submit its own opinions and recommendations before the commission can make its decision. To promote competition, protect consumer and prevent abuse of market power by dominant players, the commission and the sector regulators shall work together to issue the rules and regulations.

Confidentiality of Information 

Under Sec. 34 of RA 10667, the law protects confidential business information submitted to the commission. The identity of the persons who provide information to the Commission under condition of anonymity, as a rule, would likewise remain confidential. However, the Commission may disclose information provided that the entity agrees or if the information is required to be disclosed by law or a court. A fine of not less than Php 1,000,000.00 but not more than Php 5,000,000.00 shall be imposed if the provision is violated.

Leniency Program 

Under Sec. 35 of RA 10667, the Leniency Program shall be developed to be awarded to any entity in the form of exemption from suit or reduction of any fine in exchange of voluntary disclosure of information with regards to anti-competitive activities before or during the preliminary inquiry provided:
 If the Commission have not received yet this information from other sources.
 If the entity has shown initiative to terminate its participation therein after the discovery of illegal activity.
 If the entity provided the complete information and cooperation throughout the investigation.
 If the entity was not the head and did not persuade other parties to join in the activity.

Non-Adversarial Remedies 

Under Sec. 37 of RA 10667, the Commission shall encourage voluntary compliance with this Act and other competition laws by making available to parties the analogous non-adversarial administrative remedies.
 Binding Ruling
 When there is no prior complaint or investigation being done, any entity that is in doubt in a contemplated act is exempt from violations of the Act.
 Show Cause Order
 After conducting a preliminary inquiry or filing of complaint by an interested party against any entity that may violating the provisions of the Act, and it finds that the issuance of a show cause order would be an interest of the public, the Commission shall issue written description of the evidence conducted and require the entity to show cause why the Commission shall not issue an order to stop its business conduct practices.
 Consent Order 
 Before the Commission provided its findings on preliminary inquiry, any entity or entities under inquiry which does not admit violating this Act may submit a written proposal for the entry of consent order.
 Monitoring of Compliance
 The Commission shall monitor the compliance by the entity and entities concerned.

Appeals of the Decisions of the Commission 

Under Sec. 39 of RA 10667, decisions of the Commission shall be appealable to the Court of Appeals in accordance with the Rules of Court.

Indemnity 

Under Sec. 43 of RA 10667, the Commission shall underwrite lawsuit costs to its chairperson, Commissioners, officers, employees provided that they are not found to have violated the Act. The costs and expenses incurred in defending their actions may be paid by the Commission in advance of the disposition.

Jurisdiction of the Regional Trial Court 

Under Sec. 44 of RA 10667, the Regional Trial Court of the city or province where the entity of subject matter of the case conducts its business, shall have original and exclusive jurisdiction, regardless of the penalties imposed, of all criminal and civil cases involving violation of this Act and other competition-related laws.

Private Action 

Under Sec. 45 of RA 10667, any person who suffers direct injury by reason of any violation of this Act may institute a separate and independent civil action after the commission has completed the preliminary inquiry.

Prohibition on the Issuance of Temporary Restraining Orders, Preliminary Injunctions and Preliminary Mandatory Injunctions 

Under Sec. 47 of RA 10667, only the Court of Appeals and the Supreme Court may issue a temporary restraining order, preliminary injunction or preliminary mandatory injunction against the Commission in the exercise of its duties or functions.

Congressional Oversight Committee 

Under Sec. 49 of RA 10667, the Commission shall form the Congressional Oversight Committee (COCC) composed of the following individuals:
 Chairperson of the Senate Committee on Trade and Commerce
 Chairperson of the Senate Committee on Economic Affairs
 Chairperson of the Senate Committee on Finance
 Chairperson of the House of Representatives Committee on Economic Affairs
 Chairperson of the House of Representatives Committee on Trade and Industry
 Chairperson of the House of Representatives Committee on Appropriations
 Two (2) members each from the Senate and the House of Representatives who shall be designated by the Senate President and the Speaker of the House of Representatives

References 

Competition regulators
Government agencies under the Office of the President of the Philippines
Government agencies established in 2016
2016 establishments in the Philippines
Consumer organizations in the Philippines
Regulation in the Philippines